Elio Gerussi (20 July 1935 – 17 May 1988) was an Italian racing cyclist. He rode in the 1961 Tour de France.

References

External links
 

1935 births
1988 deaths
Italian male cyclists
Sportspeople from Nord (French department)
Cyclists from Hauts-de-France